Roydon is a small village, parish and electoral ward in the county of Norfolk, England, about a mile west of Diss.

It is mentioned in 1035 as Rygedune, and as Regadona and Regheduna in the Domesday Book, and later in 1242 as Reydon. In 1603 there were 124 communicants, and in 1736 there were 60 families, totalling 240 souls. In 1736 it was assessed for tax at 630 and a half pounds.

Roydon's current village hall was built in 1988 on the site of a previous building. The exterior wall hosts a relief carving relocated from Aldrich Brothers brush factory, in Factory Lane, which was demolished in 1972 

It also has a small village primary school, Roydon Primary that teaches 200 pupils from 4 to 11, Reception to Year 6 (Kindergarten to 5th Grade).

Its church, St Remigius, is one of 124 existing round-tower churches in Norfolk. The dedication day was kept on the first of October, being the day of his translation.

Notes

External links

St Remigius on the European Round Tower Churches website
Diss Express - village's local newspaper website

Villages in Norfolk
Civil parishes in Norfolk